Edvard Bull (22 November 1914 – 15 December 1986), Edvard Bull d.y. or Edvard Bull Jr. was a Norwegian professor and historian.

Biography
He was born in Kristiania as the son of professor and politician Edvard Bull, Sr. and Lucie Juliane Antonette Voss 1886–1970). He was active member of the Workers' Youth League (AUF). During the occupation of Norway by Nazi Germany he was imprisoned and sent to labour work in Kirkenes, and later incarcerated at Grini.

He was a lecturer in Oslo from 1939 to 1948, curator at the Norwegian Folk Museum from 1950 to 1962, professor of history at the Norwegian College of Teaching, (later the Norwegian University of Science and Technology) from 1963 to 1981 and rector there from 1966 to 1969.

He wrote a large number of articles and several books, in particular on social history and the history of the Norwegian labour movement. Among his books is volume one of Arbeiderbevegelsens historie i Norge a six-volume history series, published by Tiden Norsk Forlag between the years 1985–1990.
 
He also wrote  two volumes for Cappelens Norgeshistorie, the Cappelen series on Norwegian history:  Volume 13  Klassekamp og fellesskap 1920-1945 and Volume  14 Norge i den rike verden tiden etter 1945.

Personal life
He was married in 1939 to Andrea Nilsine Rockmann Olsen.

Selected works
Arbeiderklassen blir til. 1850–1900 
 Retten til en fortid sosialhistoriske artikler 
Norge i den rike verden tiden etter 1945 
  Klassekamp og fellesskap 1920-1945

References

1914 births
1986 deaths
Writers from Oslo
Norwegian resistance members
Grini concentration camp survivors
World War II resistance press activists
20th-century Norwegian historians